The Democratic Union or Democratic Union Party was a political party in Greece, founded by the prominent liberal and republican politician Alexandros Papanastasiou.

History
The party first contested national elections in 1923, when they ran on a joint platform with the Democratic Liberals, winning 120 seats, becoming the second largest faction after the ruling Liberal Party. In the 1926 elections they won 17 seats in the parliamentary elections, becoming the fourth-largest party in the Hellenic Parliament. The party did not contest the 1928 elections, and later disappeared.

References

Defunct political parties in Greece
Defunct liberal political parties
Liberal parties in Greece
Republican parties
Alexandros Papanastasiou